The Tongariro Northern Circuit, one of the New Zealand Great Walks, is a three- to four-day tramp in Tongariro National Park, New Zealand. The hike includes the Tongariro Alpine Crossing, a day's march that incorporates the Northern Circuit's most stunning scenery. Approximately 7,000 trampers complete the walk each year. This compares to the approximately 25,000 who walk only the Tongariro Crossing section.

Accommodation
There are three New Zealand Department of Conservation (DOC) huts around the circuit - Mangatepopo, Oturere and Waihohonu. A fourth hut, Ketetahi, was damaged in the 2012 eruption and is now only a day shelter. It is forbidden to camp within  of the track.

External links

References

 
 

Hiking and tramping tracks in New Zealand
Protected areas of Manawatū-Whanganui
Transport in Manawatū-Whanganui